Ilazgi (also Romanized as Īlazgī) is a village in Baranduzchay-ye Jonubi Rural District, in the Central District of Urmia County, West Azerbaijan Province, Iran. At the 2006 census, its population was 15, in 5 families.

References 

Populated places in Urmia County